Angel in the Wings is a musical revue with songs by Bob Hilliard and Carl Sigman and sketches by Hank Ladd, Ted Luce, Paul Hartman, and Grace Hartman.

In addition to contributing sketches, the Hartmans headlined the original Broadway production at the Coronet Theatre (now the Eugene O'Neill Theatre) which ran for 308 performances, from December 11, 1947, to September 4, 1948. The production was considered a surprise hit, with the comic dancing couple Paul and Grace Hartman both receiving the first Tony Awards for Best Actor in a Musical and Best Actress in 1948. In her Broadway musical debut, the 22-year-old Elaine Stritch delivered the most notable song of the revue, "Civilization," which went on to become a standard. Although she only had one song in the revue, Stritch was said to have gotten the loudest applause. Also in the cast were Eileen Barton, Eugenie Baird, Nadine Gae, Peter Hamilton, Robert Stanton, Viola Roache, Johnny Barnes, Janet Gaylord, Alan Green, and
Bill McGraw.

Song list

References

External links 
 

Broadway musicals
Revues
1947 musicals
Tony Award-winning musicals